The Lexington–Fayette–Richmond–Frankfort combined statistical area, created by the United States Bureau of the Census in 2020, is the 71st largest Combined Statistical Area (CSA) of the United States.  It consists of the Lexington–Fayette Metropolitan Statistical Area (MSA) and the Micropolitan Statistical Areas (which is abbreviated as μSA) of Frankfort, Kentucky, Mount Sterling, and Richmond–Berea.

• Populations are based upon published estimates by the United States Bureau of the Census.

¹Census defined area did not exist during this census. Population totals are for counties included in 2005 census MSA or CSA estimates. Population is shown for comparison purposes only and should not be used as a reference.

References

External links
Lexington-Fayette-Frankfort-Richmond, KY Combined Statistical Area (2003) map
U.S. Census Bureau State & County QuickFacts

About Metropolitan and Micropolitan Statistical Areas
Historical Metropolitan Area Definitions

Combined Statistical Areas

Metropolitan areas of Kentucky
Combined statistical areas of the United States